Soiva metsä is a 1947 poetry collection by Finnish poet and translator Aale Tynni.

1947 poems
Finnish literature